Günther Rinker (born 12 March 1950) is an Austrian footballer. He played in two matches for the Austria national football team from 1975 to 1976.

References

External links
 

1950 births
Living people
Austrian footballers
Austria international footballers
Place of birth missing (living people)
Association footballers not categorized by position